Middleburg is an extinct town in Seneca County, in the U.S. state of Ohio.

History
Middleburg was platted in 1832.

References

Geography of Seneca County, Ohio
Ghost towns in Ohio